Bowmans may refer to:

Bowmans, South Australia, a town 
Bowmans, Kent, a village in England
Bowman Gilfillan or Bowmans, a law firm in South Africa
"The Bowmans", a 1961 episode of BBC TV comedy programme Hancock